The 3rd Filmfare Awards were held in 1956.

Biraj Bahu and Jagriti won 2 awards each, with the former winning Best Director (for Bimal Roy) and Best Actress (for Kamini Kaushal), and the latter winning Best Film and Best Supporting Actor (for Abhi Bhattacharya), thus becoming the most-awarded films at the ceremony.

Main Awards

Best Film 
Jagriti

Best Director 
Bimal Roy – Biraj Bahu

Best Actor 
Dilip Kumar – Azaad

Best Actress 
Kamini Kaushal – Biraj Bahu

Best Supporting Actor – Male 
Abhi Bhattacharya – Jagriti

Best Supporting Actor – Female 
Nirupa Roy – Munimji

Best Music Director 
Hemant Kumar – Nagin for Man Dole Mera Tan Dole

Technical Awards

Best Sound 
R. Kaushik – Amar

Best Art Direction 
Rusi Banker – Mirza Ghalib

Best Cinematography 
Dwarka Divecha – Yasmin

Best Editing 
Hrishikesh Mukherjee – Naukari

References

External links
 3rd Filmfare awards

Filmfare Awards
Filmfare
1956 in Indian cinema